The University of Plymouth Students' Union (UPSU) is based on the University of Plymouth campus, in the Drake Circus area of Plymouth, Devon, England.

With about 30,000 student members it is one of the largest student unions in the UK, and hosts a wide array of events and offers services to all students.

Officers and Representatives

Sabbatical Officers 
The UPSU Sabbatical Officers are elected in March and decide the day-to-day running of the union. The Sabbatical Team consists of four full-time officers who are current students or have recently graduated as students from the University. Each has their own remit and they also provide academic and national representation for Plymouth students.

Part-time Officers 
Part-time Officers represent particular groups of students and run forums related to their role.

School Representatives 
School Representatives are elected students who share feedback and opinions of students from the Course Reps to the University's schools. They regularly meet with their faculty lead and the VP Education.

Course Representatives 
Course Representatives represent students' specific views on academic matters in their course, they're elected by the students who study that course and pass on any feedback and opinions to the School Representatives.

Committees and Forms

Union Council 
The Union Council (Formerly the Executive Committee and Student Parliament), is made up of 17 part-time officers, 4 elected Sabbatical Officers, and 12 school representatives. It is also attended by the Chief Executive and staff support members. The Chair of the Accountability Board also attends these meetings, to observe and ensure that they are taking place in a fair and democratic manner. The Union Council is in place to make important decisions that effect the student body and ensure that the wide diversity of the student body is fairly represented in these decisions.

Accountability Board 
The Accountability Board is an elected board of students who's role is to scrutinise officers and forms to ensure they're being as fair as they can be, and to hold them to account when they're not.

Student Forums
As well as sitting on Each of the 15 elected forum chairs also runs their own forum. All of the Forums are open for anyone to go along to and take part in discussions, however there are 4 Forums that you would need to identify as a member of that group to vote in Forum decisions. the accountability forum however is only open to elected members, its job is to hold, all members of UEC to account.

List of UPSU student Forums:

 Environment & Sustainability
 Faith & Belief Forum
 Global Students
 Mature Students
 Postgraduate
 Societies
 Sports
 Welfare
 Partner Institutions
 LGBT
 Women's
 Volunteering
 Accountability

Facilities
The student union was refurbished in summer 2014. The main union building is mostly underground; its top bar is known as burst bar serving smoothies, juices and teas adjacent to this is the 'Zig-Zag' bar. At the top of the SU is the lounge selling Costa coffee and sandwiches; below this is 'Illusion' which has a dance floor and pool tables, and is sometimes used for private events. Down from 'Illusion' is the main bar, known as 'Sub:Lime' which is where most of the union's events take place: it has a dance floor with DJ booth and projectors. In 2010 the union's bar won first place in the National Union of Students' Best Bar None competition, which assesses how bars manage student safety.

Attached to the main building on the first floor is an advice centre, open weekdays between 10am and 3pm. It offers to UPSU members a range of free and confidential advice, including financial and academic advice.

The union also operates a small store called SU:Shop which is located opposite the library. The shop sells basic groceries, snacks, lunch meal deals, and University of Plymouth branded merchandise.

The student union also has an accommodation service, located inside it opposite the hive.

Societies and sports clubs
The union supports societies and sports clubs, which are by an elected committee from the clubs' membership. Any student can set up a society.

Sports teams are supported by the union and the university and represent the university.

There is currently 165 societies and sports clubs at the union.

Plymouth Night Patrol 
Plymouth Night Patrol (PNP) is an award-winning society at the union who aim to keep students safe on nights out around the city by supporting students and the emergency services. They operate a control room inside the UPSU on Wednesday, Friday, and Saturday nights.

Volunteering and fundraising
The Volunteering and fundraising departments are situated in "The Hive", at the south of the building. Volunteering opportunities range from helping with a Buddy scheme, assisting with upkeep of the Monkey Sanctuary in Looe, Cornwall to helping run projects in a local Plymouth school, and more.

Rag week in February each year aims to raise both awareness of and money for charity. Events have included include a pizza eating contest, endurance, bake sales, mile of pennies, city and campus raids, pyjama day, treasure hunts, pool contests and karaoke.

Events
The union holds weekly and monthly events, and special events throughout the year.

The first event of the year is 'Freshers Week' at the start of every yeah which is open to all students. The event hosts a number of Fairs in various locations around campus including 'Freshers Fair', where companies give our freebies to students; the 'Sports Fair' and 'Society Fair', where student groups advertise themselves; and the 'Volunteering & Feel Good Fair', where students are told about support available to them and how they can participate in volunteering.

The UPSU Summer Ball is held annually at the end of the academic year (June). As well as having a number of stages and guest acts, the event usually has food stalls, a fair ground; casino (non-monetary); inflatables and various other entertainment.

Membership
All 18,500+ University of Plymouth Students are automatically members of UPSU.

Over 10,000 students do not study at the main University of Plymouth campus but at partner colleges. All Higher Education students on University of Plymouth courses at these colleges are automatically members of the UPSU and representatives are available at the larger colleges which, as of 2011, areBridgwater and Taunton College, The British College of Osteopathic Medicine, City of Bristol College, City College Plymouth, Cornwall College, Dartington Trust, Exeter College, Hydrographic and Meteorological Training Unit - HMS Drake, GSM London, Highlands College, Jersey, Institute for Export and International Trade, MLA College, PETROC, RILA Institute of Health Sciences, Royal Marines School of Music, South Devon College, Strode College, Truro and Penwith College, Weymouth College, and Yeovil College University Centre

References

External links
 University of Plymouth Student Union

University of Plymouth
Plymouth